Alessandro Balzan (born 17 October 1980 in Rovigo) is an Italian auto racing driver.

Racing career
In 1998 he stepped up from Kart racing, by competing in Italian Formula Campus and the Italian Renault Megane Cup Winter Series. A year later he drove in the Italian Renault Clio V6 Cup Winter Series, along with selected rounds of the Italian Renault Megane Cup. 2000 saw him finish the season fourth on points in the Renault Clio V6 Eurocup. That year he also became champion in the Italian Renault Clio Cup Winter Series. another title followed in 2002, winning the Italian Alfa 147 Cup.

Balzan progressed up to the European Touring Car Championship for the 2003 season. He raced an Alfa Romeo for the Bigazzi Team, and in 2004 he drove a JAS ran Honda. In 2005 and 2006 he drove in the Italian Superturismo Championship.

He competed in the inaugural season of the World Touring Car Championship in 2005, for the independent Scuderia del Girasole Team in a SEAT Toledo. Competing in five rounds, his best finish was an eleventh place in round two of the opening event at Monza. He returned to the WTCC in 2006 for the opening four rounds, this time in an Alfa Romeo 156 for DB Motorsport. Balzan managed a fourth-place finish, in race two at Monza.

For 2007 he competed in the Superstars Series in a Jaguar S-Type. In 2008 he drove a Ferrari F430 in the Italian GT Championship.

In the 2008 he drove the Ferrari 430 GT2 in the Italian Gt championship, he won 2 races and several times he finished on podium.

2009, 2010 and 2011 Porsche Carrera Cup Italian Champion, in the 2011 he set the world fastest lap ever during the Porsche Supercup qualifying at Monza, during the Formula One Gran Prix.

2012 Ferrari 458 Challenge WORLD and EUROPEAN Champion with Ferrari team Moscow.

2013 GRAND AM Season 458 GT3. Including the 24 hours of Daytona, where he finished 4th.
After a long season he won the last Rolex Gt Grand Am championship.

Racing record

Complete European Touring Car Championship results
(key) (Races in bold indicate pole position) (Races in italics indicate fastest lap)

Complete World Touring Car Championship results
(key) (Races in bold indicate pole position) (Races in italics indicate fastest lap)

Complete Porsche Supercup results
(key) (Races in bold indicate pole position) (Races in italics indicate fastest lap)

‡ Not eligible for points

Complete Blancpain Sprint Series results

Complete IMSA SportsCar Championship results
(key) (Races in bold indicate pole position; races in italics indicate fastest lap)

24 Hours of Le Mans results

References

 Alessandro Balzan at the official IMSA website
 Alessandro Balzan at Driver Database
  Alessandro Balzan at Racing Reference

External links
Official site (Italian).
 

1980 births
Living people
People from Rovigo
Italian racing drivers
World Touring Car Championship drivers
Porsche Supercup drivers
24 Hours of Daytona drivers
Rolex Sports Car Series drivers
Superstars Series drivers
WeatherTech SportsCar Championship drivers
European Touring Car Championship drivers
European Touring Car Cup drivers
International GT Open drivers
24 Hours of Le Mans drivers
GT World Challenge America drivers
Sportspeople from the Province of Rovigo
AF Corse drivers
Conquest Racing drivers
Iron Lynx drivers